Flags of the Soviet Union
 Flags of the Soviet Republics